Legislative elections were held in El Salvador on 18 January 2009. The leftist Farabundo Martí National Liberation Front (FMLN) was widely expected to win the most seats for the first time against the nationalist conservative Nationalist Republican Alliance (ARENA). As a result of the election, the Revolutionary Democratic Front, a left-wing party founded by FMLN dissidents in 2006 with the same name and symbols as the historic FDR from the Salvadoran Civil War, was deregistered as a political party as it failed to gain either a seat or 50,000 votes, as necessary to sustain registration. All parties contested the election in all departments, except for the FDR, which did not contest the election in three departments and stood jointly with the PDC in two others.

In San Isidro in Cabañas Department, voting had to be rescheduled to 25 January 2009 after a group of non-natives illegally attempted to vote.

Results

References

El Salvador
Legislative election
Legislative elections in El Salvador